Žabnik is a village in northern Croatia, part of the Sveti Martin na Muri municipality within Međimurje County.

History

Žabnik is first time mentioned in charter issued in year 1478 as Sabnyk.

Geography

Žabnik is located in part of Međimurje called Gornje Međimurje. Village is about 18 kilometres north from Čakovec, and some 110 kilometres north of Zagreb.

Settlement is situated in the alluvial plane of river Mur, on rivers right bank. Floodplain of River Mur is part of natural protected area called Regional park Mura-Drava.

Žabnik had a population of 372 in 2011 census.

Tourism 

There is a traditional mill on the river Mur. In Žabnik is also located a small horse stud of endangered autochthonous horse breed called Međimurje horse (Croatian: Međimurski konj).

An oxbow lake called Stara Mura is popular destination for anglers.

References

Populated places in Međimurje County